The Nokia 1611 was the world's first solar powered mobile phone.  This was achieved using a solar powered battery as one of the battery options.  It was announced in January 1997.

References

1611
Solar-powered mobile phones